Anoh Apollinaire Attoukora Sfondo (born June 20, 1989) is an Ivorian professional footballer who plays as a midfielder for Aviron Bayonnais.

Career
Attoukora was born in Adjamé and he was brought in Romania at Dinamo București in 2007 by coach Mircea Rednic where he played one Liga I game for the first team.

References

External links

1989 births
Living people
Footballers from Abidjan
Association football midfielders
Ivorian footballers
FC Dinamo București players
Liga I players
Liga II players
Stella Club d'Adjamé players
Pau FC players
Trélissac FC players
Aviron Bayonnais FC players
Ivorian expatriate footballers
Ivorian expatriate sportspeople in France
Ivorian expatriate sportspeople in Romania
Expatriate footballers in France
Expatriate footballers in Romania